Vladimír Dvořák (born April 18, 1985) is a Slovak professional ice hockey defenceman who played with MHC Martin of the Slovak Extraliga from 2007 to 2010.

References

External links

1985 births
Living people
HC 07 Detva players
HK Levice players
HK Spišská Nová Ves players
MHC Martin players
MHK Dolný Kubín players
Sportspeople from Martin, Slovakia
Slovak ice hockey defencemen